Anthony Raymond Lauer,  (born 19 December 1935) is a former police officer who served as the Commissioner of the New South Wales Police from 1991 until 1996. In February 1996, Lauer's term ended in controversy with his resignation soon after the start of the Wood Royal Commission into police corruption.

Education
Tony Lauer was born in Newcastle, New South Wales, on 19 December 1935 and educated at Penrith High School, University of Sydney, Australian Police Staff College, and the FBI Academy at Quantico, Virginia. Lauer is also a graduate of the FBI's 17th National Executive Institute.

Involvement in the police force
Lauer served with the New South Wales Police Force for forty-one years, as a General Duty uniform officer, Traffic Patrol cyclist, and in a wide range of criminal investigation duties. During his police service, Lauer had held the appointments of Chief Superintendent in Charge, Criminal Investigation Branch; Assistant Commissioner, Professional Responsibility; and Deputy Commissioner, State Commander.

Lauer succeeded to the position of Commissioner of Police, after the retirement of Commissioner John Avery, in March 1991. In February 1996, Lauer's term ended in controversy with his resignation soon after the start of the Wood Royal Commission into police corruption. He has stated, among other areas of the force, that the Kings Cross patrol was free of corruption, only for the Royal Commission to find that it was in fact extremely corrupt. Peter Ryan succeeded him in the position.

Lauer is a past President of the Police Association of NSW and was made a Life Member of the Association in 1983. He has served as a member of the Police Board of NSW, the Operation Review Committee of the Independent Commission Against Corruption, the Management Committee of the State Crime Commission and a Councillor of the Royal Humane Society of NSW.

Lauer is a Director of Police Bank Ltd. He is a member of the Remuneration Committee and the Credit Committee of that Bank. He also serves as a Legator with Police Legacy and as a member of the RSL's "Anzac of the Year" Award Committee.

Awards and personal life
Lauer underwent training in the Australian Army with the 19th National Service Training Battalion, Holsworthy, in 1957.

Lauer was named a Paul Harris Fellow by the Rotary Foundation of Rotary International in 1994. He is a long-standing Freemason, and served as Grand Master of the United Grand Lodge of New South Wales and the Australian Capital Territory from 2004–2006.

Lauer married Joy Stock in 1955; they have four children and numerous grandchildren.

Notes

References
Dodkin, Marilyn (2003) Bob Carr: The Reluctant Leader, University of New South Wales Press.
New South Wales Government Police Integrity Commission (1 May 1997) Royal Commission Reports, Ch. 1, 3, 4. (PDF)

1935 births
Commissioners of the New South Wales Police
Living people
People from Newcastle, New South Wales
Recipients of the Australian Police Medal
Australian Freemasons
Masonic Grand Masters